Bonnyville-Cold Lake-St. Paul is a current provincial electoral district in Alberta, Canada. The district is one of 87 districts mandated to return a single member (MLA) to the Legislative Assembly of Alberta using the first past the post method of voting. It was contested for the first time in the 2019 Alberta election.

Geography
The district is located in northeastern Alberta, containing the communities of Cold Lake, Bonnyville, St. Paul and Elk Point, the MD of Bonnyville, most of St. Paul County, the Elizabeth and Fishing Lake Metis settlements, the Cold Lake First Nations, Kehewin First Nation, and Saddle Lake. It also includes CFB Cold Lake and the uninhabited Air Weapons Range (Improvement District No. 349).

History

The district was created in 2017 when the Electoral Boundaries Commission recommended joining part of Lac La Biche-St. Paul-Two Hills to Bonnyville-Cold Lake. The Commission recommended naming the district Cold Lake-St. Paul, but the Assembly decided to retain Bonnyville in the name.

Some local officials expressed discontent with the creation of this riding, especially given that it is the most populous of the new districts. According to the 2016 census, its population is 15% above the mean. The Commission justified this variance because, in their opinion, "this is an area where future population growth is likely to fall well below the provincial average."

The district first elected United Conservative MLA Dave Hanson who had previously been elected to Lac La Biche-St. Paul-Two Hills as a Wildrose candidate in 2015. Hanson originally contested the UCP nomination against former Wildrose MLA for Bonnyville-Cold Lake Scott Cyr who would drop out prior to the constituency vote. Hanson would defeat his next closest competitor, NDP candidate and teacher Kari Whan by over 12,000 votes.

Electoral results

See also
List of Alberta provincial electoral districts

References

External links
Elections Alberta
The Legislative Assembly of Alberta

Alberta provincial electoral districts
2017 establishments in Alberta
Constituencies established in 2017